The Chang Lake, originally known as Wazi Lake, is a lake located at the junction of Jingzhou, Jingmen and Qianjiang, central China's Hubei province. It is the third largest lake in Hubei. The lake discharges into Jing River.

History
The name of Chang Lake dates back to the Ming dynasty (1368–1644).

Functions
It has many functions, such as domestic water supply, regulation and storage, flood control, fishery, tourism, irrigation, and improvement of ecological environment.

References

Lakes of Hubei
Jingzhou
Jingmen
Tourist attractions in Hubei